Trask River High School is a public high school in Tillamook, Oregon, United States.

Trask River High School operates at two adjacent facilities: Camp Tillamook and the Tillamook Youth Accountability Camp. Tillamook School District is contracted to provide education at both locations.

Academics
In 2008, 13% of the school's seniors received their high school diploma. Of 30 students, four graduated, two dropped out, and 24 were still in high school the following year.

References

High schools in Tillamook County, Oregon
Tillamook, Oregon
Boarding schools in Oregon
Public high schools in Oregon